Fritz Joost (born 14 July 1954) is a Swiss former cyclist. He competed in the team time trial event at the 1980 Summer Olympics.

References

External links
 

1954 births
Living people
Swiss male cyclists
Olympic cyclists of Switzerland
Cyclists at the 1980 Summer Olympics
Place of birth missing (living people)